Mar Eliya IV (or  IV) was the patriarch of the Church of the East from  1405 until  1425. His reign falls in a period of obscurity owing to the limited contemporary evidence.

He appears in a contemporary list of patriarchs in a 15th-century manuscript copy of the Book of the Bee between two patriarchs named Shemʿon. Traditionally these are Shemʿon III and Shemʿon IV, but David Wilmshurst has argued on the basis of the aforementioned manuscript that there was only one Shemʿon between Denha II and Eliya IV, and that this must be Shemʿon II. He suggests placing Shemʿon III after Eliya IV.

In view of the upheavals in Iraq in his time, it is unlikely that he was consecrated in Baghdad. Probably he was consecrated and resided in a monastery in northern Iraq. Traditionally his death has been placed in 1437, since in that year a patriarch named Shemʿon is mentioned in a dating clause in a manuscript colophon. A colophon in a manuscript copied by the scribe Masʿud of Kfarburan, dating to 1429/30, also mentions a patriarch Shemʿon, which would push back Eliya's death date to the 1420s.

Notes

Bibliography

14th-century births
1420s deaths
15th-century bishops of the Church of the East
Patriarchs of the Church of the East